Igor Vsevolodovich Girkin (born 17 December 1970), also known by the alias Igor Ivanovich Strelkov, is a Russian army veteran and former Federal Security Service (FSB) officer who played a key role in the annexation of Crimea by the Russian Federation, and later the war in Donbas as an organizer of militant groups in the Donetsk People's Republic (DPR).

While leading a group of separatist militants into Ukraine in the 2014 Siege of Sloviansk, Girkin gained influence and attention, being appointed to the position of Minister of Defense in the Donetsk People's Republic, a puppet state of Russia.

Girkin was dismissed from his position in August 2014, after 298 people died when Malaysia Airlines Flight 17 was shot down.  Dutch prosecutors charged Girkin and three others with murder, and issued an international arrest warrant against him.  Girkin has admitted "moral responsibility" but denies pushing the button. On 17 November 2022, Girkin was found guilty for the murder of 298 people, convicted of all charges in absentia, and issued a life sentence.

Girkin, a self-described Russian nationalist, was charged by Ukrainian authorities with terrorism. He has been sanctioned by the European Union, United States, United Kingdom, Australia, Japan, Canada, Switzerland, and Ukraine for his leading role in the armed conflict in eastern Ukraine. Ukrainian authorities have called him a retired colonel of the GRU (Russia's external military intelligence organisation).

After his service in the war, Girkin returned to Russia as a political activist in 2014, reportedly believing that the "liberal clans" (liberal part of Russian elites) must be destroyed in favor of "law enforcement" ones.

During the 2022 Russian invasion of Ukraine, Girkin regained attention as a milblogger, taking a strong pro-war stance but fiercely criticizing the Russian military for what he saw as incompetence and "insufficiency". In October 2022, Girkin joined a volunteer unit fighting against Ukrainian forces.

Early life
Girkin was born in Moscow, Russia, on December 17, 1970.

According to The New York Times, "his ideological rigidity precedes any connections he has to Russia's security services, stretching back at least to his days at the Moscow State Institute for History and Archives. There, Girkin obsessed over military history and joined a small but vocal group of students who advocated a return to monarchism."

Vice News claimed that "during the 1990s, Girkin wrote for the right-wing Russian newspaper Zavtra, which is run by the anti-Semitic Russian nationalist Alexander Prokhanov" and where Alexander Borodai was an editor. Writing for Zavtra ("Tomorrow"), Girkin and Borodai, who too was reported to have fought for Russia-backed Transnistria and Republika Srpska separatists in Moldova and Bosnia and Herzegovina, together covered the Russian war against separatists in Chechnya and Dagestan.

He would also often write as a "Colonel in the Reserves" on Middle East subjects, such as the conflicts in Libya, Egypt and Syria, and for the Abkhazian Network News Agency (ANNA), a Russian-language pro-Russian publication which supports Abkhazian separatism in Georgia.

FSB service (1996-2003)
The Russian media has identified Girkin as an officer of the Russian military reserves who has expressed hardline views on eliminating perceived enemies of the Russian state. He has fought on the federal side in Russian counter-separatist campaigns in Chechnya and on the pro-Moscow separatist side in the conflict in Moldova's breakaway region of Transnistria.

In 1999, he published his memoirs of the fighting in Bosnia and Herzegovina. In 2014, he was accused by Bosnian media (Klix.ba) and a retired Bosnian Army officer of having been involved in the Višegrad massacres in which thousands of civilians were killed in 1992.

The BBC reported Girkin may have worked for Russia's Federal Security Service (FSB) in a counter-terrorism unit, citing Russian military experts. According to Russian media, he has served as an FSB officer and his last role before retirement was reportedly with the FSB's Directorate for Combating International Terrorism.

In 2014 Anonymous International disclosed what it said were Girkin's personal emails, revealing that he had served in the FSB for 18 years from 1996 to March 2013, including in Chechnya from 1999 to 2005, The Moscow Times reported. The newspaper also said Girkin was born in Moscow and that it contacted him by email and phone but that he would not confirm the claims. A local pro-Russia militia leader in Ukraine, Vyacheslav Ponomarev, a self-described old friend of Girkin's, said the information about Girkin was true. His pseudonym "Strelkov" ("Strelok") can be roughly translated as "Rifleman" or "Shooter". He has also been dubbed Igor Groznyy ("Igor the Terrible").

Chechen Wars

Alexander Cherkasov, head of Russia's leading human rights group Memorial, is convinced that the "Igor Strelkov" involved in Ukraine is the same person as a Russian military officer called "Strelkov", who was identified as being directly responsible for at least six instances (on four occasions) of the forced disappearance and presumed murder of residents of Chechnya's mountain Vedensky District village of Khatuni and nearby settlements of Makhkety and Tevzeni in 20012002, when "Strelkov" was attached to the 45th Detached Reconnaissance Regiment special forces unit of the Russian Airborne Troops based near Khatuni.

None of these crimes were solved by official investigations. The website of Chechnya's official human rights ombudsman lists several residents of Khatuni who went missing in 2001 (Beslan Durtayev and Supyan Tashayev) as having been kidnapped from their homes and taken to the 45th DRR base by the officers known as "Colonel Proskuryn and Strelkov Igor". Another entry lists the missing person Beslan Taramov as abducted in 2001 in the village of Elistandzhi by the 45th DRR servicemen led by "Igor Strelko (nicknamed Strikal)".

Cherkasov also lists Durtayev and Tashayev (but not Taramov) among the alleged victims of "Strelkov". Cherkasov and other observers suspected it was in fact the same "Strelkov" until May 2014, when Girkin himself confirmed he has been present at Khatuni in 2001, where he fought against the "local population".

According to Cherkasov, as a result of Girkin's actions in Chechnya, two sisters of one of those "disappeared", Uvais Nagayev, in effect turned to terrorism and died three years later: one of these sisters, Aminat Nagayeva, blew herself up in the 2004 Russian aircraft bombings over the Tula Oblast aboard a Tu-134 "Volga-Aeroexpress" airliner, killing 43. The other sister, Rosa Nagayeva, participated in the Beslan hostage crisis that same year.

The emails leaked in May 2014 and allegedly authored by Girkin contain his diaries from Bosnia and Chechnya that he sent to his friends for review. One story describes an operation of capturing Chechen activists from a village of Mesker-Yurt. Asked by one of friends why he didn't publish them, Girkin explained that "people we captured and questioned almost always disappeared without trace, without court, after we were done" and this is why these stories cannot be openly published.

Involvement in the War in Donbas and annexation of Crimea (2014)

Crimea 
Girkin was one of the major "Russian self-defence" commanders in the 2014 Crimean crisis. In an interview on 22 January 2015, he explained that the "overwhelming national support for the self-defence" as portrayed by the Russian media was fiction, and a majority of the law enforcement, administration and army were opposed to it. Girkin stated that under his command, the rebels "collected" deputies into the chambers, and had to "forcibly drive the deputies to vote [to join Russia]". He was also reported to be instrumental in negotiating the 2014 defection of the Ukrainian Navy commander Denis Berezovsky. 

According to an accomplice, Girkin arrived in Crimea describing himself as the "Kremlin's emissary," and soon after formed the Crimean self-defense forces. His position was above that of self-declared Crimea prime minister Sergei Aksyonov. His main task in March 2014 was the accelerated military training of the newly formed Crimean forces, and selecting the best among them for transfer to the invasion of the Donbas. Girkin personally negotiated and oversaw the withdrawal of Ukrainian forces from Crimea.

According to Girkin, he was in charge of the Simferopol Photogrammatic Center's assault.

Sloviansk

Pro-Russian capture of Sloviansk 

According to Girkin, the head of the newly instituted Russian government in Crimea Sergei Aksyonov asked him to deal with the northern provinces.

On 12 April 2014, Girkin led a group of militants who seized the executive committee building, the police department, and the Security Service of Ukraine offices in Sloviansk. Girkin claimed that his militia was formed in Crimea and consisted of volunteers from Russia, Crimea, and also from other regions of Ukraine (Vinnitsa, Zhitomir, Kyiv) and many people from Donetsk and the Luhansk region. According to him, two-thirds were Ukrainian citizens.

The majority of men in the unit had combat experience. Many of those with Ukrainian citizenship had fought in the Russian Armed Forces in Chechnya and Central Asia, while others had fought in Iraq and Yugoslavia with the Ukrainian Armed Forces. In an interview, Girkin stated that he was given orders not to give up Sloviansk.

On 15 April 2014 the Security Service of Ukraine (SBU) opened a criminal proceeding against "Igor Strelkov" for his actions in Sloviansk and Crimea, describing him as the chief organizer of the "terror" in Sloviansk Raion, including an ambush that killed one and wounded three SBU officers.

On 16 April, he allegedly sought to recruit Ukrainian soldiers captured at the entrance to Kramatorsk.

The SBU presented Girkin's presence in Donbas as proof of Russia's involvement in the East Ukraine crisis. They released intercepted telephone conversations between "Strelkov" and his supposed handlers in Moscow. Russia denied any interference in Ukraine by its troops outside Crimea.

In July 2014, Ukrainian authorities alleged that Russian Defense Minister Sergei Shoigu coordinated all of Girkin's actions, supplying him and "other terrorist leaders" with "the most destructive weapons" since May and instructing him directly, with Russian President Vladimir Putin's approval.

Involvement in kidnapping and murder 
Ukrainian government claims Girkin was behind the 17 April 2014 kidnapping, torture and murder of a local Ukrainian politician Volodymyr Rybak and a 19-year-old college student Yury Popravko. Rybak's abduction by a group of men in Horlivka was recorded on camera. The SBU released portions of intercepted calls in which another Russian citizen, alleged GRU officer and Girkin's subordinate Igor Bezler orders Rybak to be "neutralized", and a subsequent conversation in which "Strelkov" is heard instructing Ponomarev to dispose of Rybak's body, which is "lying here [in the basement of the separatist headquarters in Sloviansk] and beginning to smell."

Rybak's corpse with a smashed head, multiple stab wounds and ripped stomach was found later in April in a river near Sloviansk. Popravko's body was found nearby. Ukrainian Interior Minister Arsen Avakov described Girkin as "a monster and a killer". The incident helped prompt the government's "anti-terrorist" military offensive against the pro-Russia separatists in Ukraine.

In an interview with "Radio-KP" on 18 January 2016, Girkin acknowledged that he used extrajudicial punishment, and at least four people were executed by firing squad while he was in Sloviansk. In May 2020 Girkin confessed in an interview with Ukrainian journalist Dmitry Gordon that he ordered the killing of Popravko and another man: "Yes, these people were shot on my orders. No one ripped open their stomach. Do I regret that they were shot? No, they were enemies." Girkin also stated that the killing of Rybak was also to some extent under his responsibility.

Supreme Commander of the Donetsk People's Republic 

During the weekend of 26–27 April 2014, the political leader of the separatist-controlled Donetsk People's Republic (DPR), Girkin's long-time friend, Alexander Borodai, also a Russian national from Moscow, ceded control of all separatist fighters in the entire Donetsk region to him. On 26 April, "Strelkov" made his first public appearance when he gave a video interview to Komsomolskaya Pravda where he confirmed that his militia in Sloviansk came from Crimea.

He said nothing about his own background, denied receiving weapons or ammunition from Russia, and announced that his militia would not release the Organization for Security and Co-operation in Europe (OSCE) observers that it had taken hostage unless pro-Russia activists were first freed by the Ukrainian government. On 28 April, the EU sanctioned "Igor Strelkov" as a GRU staff member believed to be a coordinator of armed actions and a security assistant to Crimea's Sergey Aksyonov.

On 29 April, Girkin appointed a new police chief for Kramatorsk. On 12 May, "I. Strelkov" declared himself "the Supreme Commander of the DPR" and all of its "military units, security, police, customs, border guards, prosecutors, and other paramilitary structures".

According to a report issued by the Office of the United Nations High Commissioner for Human Rights, "reportedly, on 26 May, by order of Strelkov, Dmytro Slavov ('commander of a company of the people's militia') and Mykola Lukyanov ('commander of a platoon of the militia of Donetsk People's Republic') were "executed" in Sloviansk, after they were "sentenced" for "looting, armed robbery, kidnapping and abandoning the battle field". The order, which was circulated widely and posted in the streets in Slovyansk, referred to a decree of the Presidium of the Supreme Council of the USSR of 22 June 1941 as the basis for the execution."

The report also mentions Girkin's efforts to recruit local women into his armed formations: "A particular call for women to join the armed groups was made on 17 May through a video released with Girkin "Strelkov", urging women of the Donetsk region to enlist in combat units." Sloviansk's separatist "people's mayor" and former boss of Girkin, Ponomarev, was himself detained on an order of Girkin on 10 June for "engaging in activities incompatible with the goals and tasks of the civil administration".

Loss of Sloviansk and aftermath 

Girkin and his militants fled from Sloviansk on the night of 4–5 July 2014, during a large-scale offensive by the Ukrainian military, following the end of a 10-day ceasefire on 30 June. Sloviansk was then captured by Ukrainian forces, thus ending the separatist occupation of the city which had started on 6 April. Shortly before this, a video was posted on YouTube in which Girkin desperately pleaded for military aid from Russia for "Novorossiya" ("New Russia", an historical name for South-East Ukraine with particular popularity amongst separatists) and said Sloviansk "will fall earlier than the rest".

Other rebel leaders denied Girkin's assessment that the people's militia were on the verge of collapse. One of them, the self-proclaimed "people's governor" of Donetsk Pavel Gubarev, compared Girkin to the 19th century Russian general Mikhail Kutuzov, claiming that both "Strelkov" and Kutuzov would "depart only before a decisive, victorious battle".

His retreat was strongly criticized by the Russian nationalist Sergey Kurginyan. A rumor inside Russian ultranationalist circles alleged Russia's powerful "grey cardinal" figure Vladislav Surkov conspired with east Ukrainian oligarch Rinat Akhmetov to organize a campaign against "Strelkov" as well as against the Eurasianism ideologue Alexander Dugin. Kurginyan accused Girkin of surrendering Sloviansk and not keeping his oath to die in Sloviansk.

Kurginyan believes that surrendering Sloviansk is a war crime, and Girkin should be responsible for that. The DPR security minister Alexander Khodakovsky, who defected from the SBU Alpha Group and who commanded the rebel Vostok Battalion, also protested and threatened a mutiny.

On 10 July 2014, news outlet Mashable reported finding execution orders three days earlier for Slavov and Lukyanov in Girkin's abandoned Sloviansk headquarters. The orders were signed "Strelkov" with the name Girkin Igor Vsevolodovich printed underneath. Also sentenced to death was Alexei Pichko, a civilian who was caught stealing two shirts and a pair of pants from an abandoned house of his neighbour. According to an unconfirmed story, his body "had been dumped on the front lines" after he was executed.

On 24 July, Ukrainian authorities exhumed several corpses from a mass grave site on the grounds of a children's hospital near the Jewish cemetery in Slovyansk, which might contain as many as 20 bodies of those executed by order of Girkin. Among the identified victims were four Ukrainian Protestants who the police and locals said had been kidnapped on 8 June, after attending a service at their church. They were falsely accused of helping the Ukrainian Army, robbed for their cars, and shot the following day.

Malaysia Airlines Flight 17 

Multiple sources cited a post on the VKontakte social networking service that was made by an account under Girkin's name which acknowledged shooting down an aircraft at approximately the same time that the civilian airliner Malaysia Airlines Flight 17 (MH17) was reported to have crashed in eastern Ukraine in the same area near the Russian border on 17 July 2014. The post specifically referenced how warnings were issued for planes not to fly in their airspace and the downing of a Ukrainian military Antonov An-26 transport plane which the Ukraine Crisis Media Center suggested was a case of misidentification with the MH17.

This post was deleted later in the day and the account behind it claimed that Girkin has no official account on this social service. Most of the 298 victims in the plane's crash came from the Netherlands. On 19 July the country's biggest newspaper De Telegraaf included Girkin's photo in the front page collage of pro-Russian rebel leaders under the one-word headline "Murderers" ("Moordenaars"). Russian opposition lawyer and politician Mark Feygin posted a purported order by Girkin where he instructs all his men and commanders who "have in their possession personal effects from this plane" to deliver the found items to his HQ so "the valuables (watches, earrings, pendants, and other jewelry and items from valuable metals)" would be transferred to "the Defense Fund of the DPR."

Girkin was the author of an alternative version of the incident, wherein "no living people were aboard the plane as it flew on autopilot from Amsterdam, where it had been loaded with "rotting corpses"." This lie was then 
"not only aired on all state-controlled media outlets, but was the subject of serious discussion."

At his press-conference on 28 July 2014, Girkin denied his connection to the downed plane and announced that his militants were killing "black-skinned" mercenaries.

In July 2015 a writ was filed in an American court by families of 18 victims formally accusing Girkin of "orchestrating the shootdown". The writ claimed damages of US$900 million and was brought under the Torture Victim Protection Act of 1991.

On 19 June 2019, the Dutch-led Joint Investigation Team (JIT), investigating the shooting down of MH17, officially announced a criminal case against Girkin and three other men. The court proceedings were scheduled to start on 9 March 2020 before the District Court of The Hague, at the  The JIT said it would ask Russia to extradite the suspects who are currently on Russian soil, saying: "The criminal trial will take place even if the suspects choose not to appear in court." Interfax news agency quoted Girkin as saying: "I do not give any comments. The only thing I can say is the rebels did not shoot down the Boeing."

On 17 November 2022, following a trial in absentia in the Netherlands, Girkin, along with another Russian and a Ukrainian, was found guilty of murdering all 298 people on board flight MH17 by participating in shooting it down. The Dutch court also ruled that Russia was in control of the separatist forces fighting in eastern Ukraine at the time.

Dismissal as Donetsk People's Republic minister 
According to ITAR-TASS news agency on Wednesday, 13 August 2014, Girkin was seriously wounded the previous day in fierce fighting in the pro-Russian rebel held territories of Eastern Ukraine, and was described to be in "grave" condition. DNS representative Sergei Kavtaradze refuted this news shortly after, saying Girkin is "alive and well".

On 14 August the leadership of the DNR announced that Girkin was dismissed from his position of defense minister "on his own request" as he was assigned "some other tasks". On 16 August the Russian TV-Zvezda claimed that Girkin was "on vacation". It claimed that he was appointed as a military chief of the combined forces of Luhansk and Donetsk (he had been in command of Donetsk forces only) and after he returns he will be put to a task of creating an unified command over the forces of the Federal State of Novorossiya. According to Stanislav Belkovskiy, the main reason for the removal of Girkin from the "defense minister" position was the amount of attention caused by the downing of MH17 and the negative impact on Russia's actions in Ukraine that it caused.

On 22 August a former rebel Anton Raevsky ("Nemetz") said in an interview in Rostov-on-Don that Girkin and his supporters are being cleansed from the DNR by the FSB, because of this insufficient compliance with Kremlin's policy on the republic. According to the Nemtsov Report, Girkin later acknowledged that he resigned from his official position in the DNR due to pressure from the Kremlin.

In November 2014 in an interview for "Moscow Speaking" radio, Girkin said that "the existence of Luhansk and Donetsk People's Republics in their current form, with the low-profile but still bloody war, is definitely convenient for USA in the first place, and only for them, because they are the ulcer that divides Russia and Ukraine". Later in November in an interview for Zavtra newspaper Girkin stated that the war in Donbas was launched by his detachment despite both Ukrainian government and local combatants having avoided an armed confrontation before. Also he recognized himself responsible for the actual situation in Donetsk and other cities of the region.

Civilian life in Russia (2014–2022)
In late April 2014, "Strelkov" was identified by Ukrainian intelligence as Colonel Igor Girkin, registered as a resident of Moscow. Journalists visiting the apartment where he allegedly lived with his mother, sister, as well as his former wife and two sons, were told by neighbors that a "fancy black car" had that same morning picked up the woman living there. The neighbors also described him as "polite" and quiet.

Girkin claims that he worked as a security chief for the controversial Russian businessmen Konstantin Malofeev. The Prime Minister of the self-proclaimed Donetsk Republic Alexander Borodai was also a close associate of the businessman.

According to the 2022 Bellingcat investigation, Girkin was using a Russian internal passport issued in the fictional name of Sergey Viktorovich Runov. Runov was the surname of his maternal grandfather, as well as the maiden name of his mother (as Runova). Passports from the same series have been used by several FSB operatives, including Zelimkhan Khangoshvili murderer Vadim Krasikov and members of the FSB squad involved in the poisoning of Alexei Navalny.

Andrey Piontkovsky adduces Girkin's name among the those of like-minded persons and says, "The authentic high-principled Hitlerites, true Aryans Dugin, Prokhanov, Prosvirin, Kholmogorov, Girkin, Prilepin are a marginalized minority in Russia." Piontkovsky adds, "Putin has stolen the ideology of the Russian Reich from the domestic Hitlerites, he has preventively burned them down, using their help to do so, hundreds of their most active supporters in the furnace of the Ukrainian Vendée." In his interview with Radio Liberty, Piontkovsky says, maybe the meaning of the operation conducted by Putin is to reveal all these potential passionate leaders of social revolt, send them to Ukraine and burn them in the furnace of the Ukrainian Vendée.

In his interview with Oleksandr Chalenko on 2 December 2014, according to the journalist, Girkin confirmed that he is an FSB colonel, but this claim was then subjected to censorship and omitted from publishing. He also acknowledged that anarchy exists among the so-called Novorossiya militants. He stated that Igor Bezler's militants in particular acted independently, the so-called "Russian Orthodox Army" had split in half, and other forces represented a patchwork of various unrelated groups. Girkin criticised the ongoing attacks on the Donetsk International Airport as pointless and harmful.

After Luhansk commander Alexander "Batman" Bednov was killed by other militants in January 2015, Girkin criticised the killing as a "murder" and "gangster ambush", and suggested that other commanders seriously consider leaving Donbas to Russia, as he did. In a January 2015 interview for Anna News, Girkin said that in his opinion "Russia is currently at state of war", since the volunteers who arrive to Donbas "are being supplied with arms and shells". He also noted that "he never separated Ukraine from Soviet Union in his mind" so he considers the conflict as a "civil war in Russia".

In May 2016, Girkin announced the creation of the Russian National Movement, a neo-imperialist political party. The party is in favor of "uniting the Russian Federation, Ukraine, Belarus, and other Russian lands into a single all-Russian state and transforming the entire territory of the former USSR into an unconditional zone of Russian influence." Girkin said "the Russian National Movement fully rejects President Vladimir Putin's regime and calls for an end to the current climate of fear and intimidation of Russia's citizens". The party has called for "strict quota system for migrant workers from the former Soviet republics in Central Asia and the Caucasus" and the cancelling of laws on internet control.

2022 Russian invasion of Ukraine
With the Russian invasion of Ukraine on late February, Girkin became again a public figure, covering the war though his warblog on Telegram. Girkin has a pro-war position, but has been noted for criticisms directed against the Russian military and the Ministry of Defence, including the defense minister Sergei Shoigu, in how the invasion has been unsuccessful, inefficient and insufficient.  Unlike the liberal and pro-democracy opposition to Vladimir Putin and independent journalists who are persecuted for criticizing the war in Ukraine or Putin, ultra-nationalists and pro-war activists like Girkin are considered untouchable because they are protected by high-ranking members of the military and intelligence services. Bellingcat journalist Christo Grozev believes Girkin is shielded from being censored by a "war party" inside the FSB.

Due the initial failures of the Russian invasion, Girkin called on 29 March for a general mobilization. On 21 April Girkin raised the opinion that "without at least a partial mobilization in the Russian Federation, it will be impossible and highly dangerous to launch a deep strategic offensive against the so-called Ukraine".

On 15 August, Girkin was reportedly detained in Crimea while attempting to travel to the frontline near Kherson.

After large Ukrainian conteroffensives in September 2022, he predicted a complete defeat for Russian troops in Ukraine. He said that full mobilization in Russia was the "last chance" for victory. On 12 September, he called the Russian attacks on Ukrainian power plants "very useful". He also said that Defense Minister Sergei Shoigu should be executed by firing squad and called for the use of tactical nuclear weapons in order "to drive 20 million refugees to Europe."

In early October 2022 Girkin left for Ukraine in order to fight in one of the Russian volunteer units. That same month, it was reported that the Ukrainian government crowdfunded a US$150,000 reward for his capture. In December 2022, he wrote about his experience: "Simply put, the troops are fighting by inertia, not having the slightest idea of the ultimate strategic goals of the military campaign. In most parts of the RF [Russian Federation] Armed Forces, soldiers and officers do not understand: In the name of what, for what, and with what purposes they are fighting. It’s a mystery for them: What is the condition for victory or just a condition for ending the war."

Personal life

Girkin is known as a fan of military-historical movement and has participated in several reenactments connected with various periods of Russian and international history, especially the Russian Civil War where he would play a White movement officer. His personal idol and role model is said to be the White Guard general Mikhail Drozdovsky, killed in a battle with the Red Army in 1919.

Notes

References

External links

 
Biography of Strelkov: About my background and nationality. 17-06-2018 
Website of Igor Strelkov's movement 

1970 births
Federal Security Service officers
People of the Donetsk People's Republic
GRU officers
Living people
Malaysia Airlines Flight 17
Army of Republika Srpska soldiers
People of the Chechen wars
Military personnel from Moscow
Pro-Russian people of the 2014 pro-Russian unrest in Ukraine
Russian nationalists
Russian memoirists
Individuals designated as terrorist by the government of Ukraine
Pro-Russian people of the war in Donbas
Russian people convicted of murder
Russian mass murderers
Russian individuals subject to the U.S. Department of the Treasury sanctions
Russian individuals subject to European Union sanctions
People convicted of murder by the Netherlands
War criminals